It Happened in Pikesville is a 1916 American silent comedy film short featuring Oliver Hardy.

Cast
 Raymond McKee - Exhausted Eddy
 C. W. Ritchie - Spent Spencer (as Charles W. Ritchie)
 Billy Bowers - Vimless Victor
 Harry Lorraine - Police Chief
 Oliver Hardy - Jiggs (as Babe Hardy)
 Mabel Paige - Julia Jiggs
 Ben Walker - Janitor
 Burt Bucher - Policeman

See also
 Oliver Hardy filmography

External links

1916 films
1916 short films
American silent short films
American black-and-white films
Films directed by Jerold T. Hevener
1916 comedy films
Silent American comedy films
American comedy short films
1910s American films